Thomas Walter Bickett (February 28, 1869December 28, 1921) was the 54th governor of the U.S. state of North Carolina from 1917 to 1921. He was born in Monroe, North Carolina.

Bickett was a graduate of Wake Forest College.  Prior to being elected Governor, Bickett practiced law in Louisburg, represented Franklin County in the North Carolina General Assembly and then served as North Carolina Attorney General for two terms (1909–1917).

In 1916, Bickett became the first state governor who was nominated by means of a Democratic Party primary election (in which he defeated Lt. Gov. Elijah L. Daughtridge). Under Bickett's leadership, the state saw improvements in child welfare, public health, electricity, and running water. He persuaded the legislature to establish the state's first income tax. He also had to lead the state through World War I.

Walter Bickett Elementary in Monroe, North Carolina (where he was born) is named for him. Two school locations have his name. The original Walter Bickett School opened in March 1922 on Lancaster Avenue as Monroe High School, the city's first high school, and was named "sometime later" for Bickett. It remained a high school until the present Monroe High School was built in 1960, and was replaced in 2003 with a new Walter Bickett Elementary. The older building became Walter Bickett Pre-K Education Center.

Notes

External links
North Carolina Historical Marker

1869 births
1921 deaths
Wake Forest University alumni
Democratic Party members of the North Carolina House of Representatives
People from Louisburg, North Carolina
Democratic Party governors of North Carolina
North Carolina Attorneys General
People from Monroe, North Carolina
19th-century American lawyers
20th-century American lawyers
20th-century American politicians